The Hamburg 1910 chess tournament (the 17th DSB Congress) was organized by Walter Robinow, the President of the Hamburg Chess Club (Hamburger Schachklubs).

Masters Tournament
Eighteen masters started but Franz Jakob withdrew after round 6.

The results and standings:

{|class="wikitable" style="text-align: left"
! # !! Player !! 1 !! 2 !! 3 !! 4 !! 5 !! 6 !! 7 !! 8 !! 9 !! 10 !! 11 !! 12 !! 13 !! 14 !! 15 !! 16 !! 17 !! 18 !! Total
|-
|1 ||   ||x ||0 ||1 ||½ ||½ ||½ ||1 ||1 ||½ ||1 ||1 ||1 ||½ ||1 ||½ ||½ ||1 ||- ||11½
|-
|2 ||  ||1 ||x ||1 ||½ ||1 ||½ ||½ ||1 ||½ ||0 ||½ ||1 ||1 ||1 ||0 ||½ ||1 ||- ||11
|-
|3 ||   ||0 ||0 ||x ||1 ||½ ||1 ||½ ||½ ||1 ||1 ||1 ||½ ||0 ||½ ||1 ||1 ||1 ||- ||10½
|-
|4 ||   ||½ ||½ ||0 ||x ||½ ||0 ||½ ||½ ||1 ||1 ||0 ||1 ||1 ||½ ||1 ||1 ||1 ||- ||10
|-
|5 ||  ||½ ||0 ||½ ||½ ||x ||1 ||1 ||½ ||0 ||½ ||½ ||½ ||1 ||½ ||½ ||1 ||1 ||-  ||9½
|-
|6 ||  ||½ ||½ ||0 ||1 ||0 ||x ||0 ||½ ||1 ||½ ||½ ||0 ||1 ||1 ||1 ||1 ||1 ||-  ||9½
|-
|7 ||  ||0 ||½ ||½ ||½ ||0 ||1 ||x ||½ ||0 ||1 ||1 ||0 ||½ ||0 ||1 ||1 ||1 ||- ||8½
|-
|8 ||  ||0 ||0 ||½ ||½ ||½ ||½ ||½ ||x ||0 ||0 ||1 ||1 ||½ ||½ ||1 ||1 ||1 ||- ||8½
|-
|9 ||  ||½ ||½ ||0 ||0 ||1 ||0 ||1 ||1 ||x ||½ ||0 ||½ ||½ ||½ ||1 ||1 ||0 ||-  ||8
|-
|10 ||  ||0 ||1 ||0 ||0 ||½ ||½ ||0 ||1 ||½ ||x ||½ ||½ ||½ ||1 ||1 ||½ ||½ ||-  ||8
|-
|11 ||  ||0 ||½ ||0 ||1 ||½ ||½ ||0 ||0 ||1 ||½ ||x ||1 ||1 ||0 ||0 ||0 ||1 ||-  ||7
|-
|12 ||  ||0 ||0 ||½ ||0 ||½ ||1 ||1 ||0 ||½ ||½ ||0 ||x ||0 ||1 ||1 ||½ ||½  ||- ||7
|-
|13 ||  || ½ ||0 ||1 ||0 ||0 ||0 ||½ ||½ ||½ ||½ ||0 ||1 ||x ||½ ||0 ||1 ||1  ||- ||7
|-
|14 ||  ||0 ||0 ||½ ||½ ||½ ||0 ||1 ||½ ||½ ||0 ||1 ||0 ||½ ||x ||1 ||0 ||1  ||- ||7
|-
|15 ||  ||½ ||1 ||0 ||0 ||½ ||0 ||0 ||0 ||0 ||0 ||1 ||0 ||1 ||0 ||x ||1 ||½  ||- ||5½
|-
|16 ||  ||½ ||½ ||0 ||0 ||0 ||0 ||0 ||0 ||0 ||½ ||1 ||½ ||0 ||1 ||0 ||x ||1 ||- ||5
|-
|17 ||  ||0 ||0 ||0 ||0 ||0 ||0 ||0 ||0 ||1 ||½ ||0 ||½ ||0 ||0 ||½ ||0 ||x  ||- ||2½
|-
| - ||  ||- ||- ||- ||- ||- ||0 ||- ||½ ||- ||½ ||- ||0 ||- ||- ||- ||½ ||0  ||x || 1½
|}

Hauptturnier A
Sixteen players started but Matteo Gladig withdrew after round 4.

The final results:

1. Gersz Rotlewi 

2. Carl Carls 

3-4. Carl Ahues 

3-4. Karel Hromadka 

5. Edward Lasker 

6-7. Solomon Rosenthal 

6-7. Adrian Garcia Conde 

8. G. Mayer 

9-10. E. Busch 

9-10. Eugene Ernest Colman 

11. Gustaf Nyholm 

12-13. Paul Fiebig 

12-13. H. Gouwentak 

14-15. Bernhard Gregory 

14-15. Arthur Kürschner 

–  Matteo Gladig

References

Chess competitions
Chess in Germany
Sports competitions in Hamburg
1910 in chess
1910 in German sport
1910s in Hamburg